The 2005–06 snooker season was a series of snooker tournaments played between 17 May 2005 and 10 May 2006. There were six ranking tournaments, and the British Open and Irish Masters tournaments were removed from calendar. The Northern Ireland Trophy was held for the first time as non-ranking tournament, and the Pot Black was held again after a 12-year hiatus.

New professional players
Countries
 
 
 
 
 
 
 
Note: new in this case means that these players were not on the 2004/2005 professional Main Tour.

International champions 

WPBSA Wildcard

From Challenge Tour

Calendar
The following table outlines the results and dates for the ranking and major invitational events that took place.

Official rankings 

The top 16 of the world rankings, these players automatically played in the final rounds of the world ranking events and were invited for the Masters.

World ranking points 

The rankings for the 2006–07 season were based on the total points from the 2004–05 and 2005–06 seasons. There were 6 ranking events during the 2005–06 season.

Points distribution 
2005/2006 Points distribution for world ranking events:

Notes

References

External links

2005
Season 2006
Season 2005